Antonio Latimer Rivera (born November 26, 1978) is a Puerto Rican professional basketball player. Latimer has played in the NCAA and the National Superior Basketball League of Puerto Rico (BSN) with Ponce Lions, Coamo Marathon Runners, Mayagüez Indios, and Bayamon Cowboys. Latimer has also played internationally in Israel and Spain Latimer was a member of the Puerto Rican National Basketball Team.

Brief biography
Latimer spent his college years playing for Southern Missouri. He has played professionally in the National Superior Basketball League of Puerto Rico since 1994. Latimer has been a member of the Puerto Rican National Basketball Team in 2002 and 2006.

Career statistics

References

External links
Profile

1978 births
Living people
Baloncesto Superior Nacional players
Basketball players at the 1999 Pan American Games
Basketball players at the 2003 Pan American Games
Israeli Basketball Premier League players
Leones de Ponce basketball players
Maccabi Givat Shmuel players
Missouri Southern Lions men's basketball players
Pan American Games bronze medalists for Puerto Rico
People from Río Piedras, Puerto Rico
Puerto Rican men's basketball players
Puerto Rico men's national basketball team players
Pan American Games medalists in basketball
2006 FIBA World Championship players
2002 FIBA World Championship players
Power forwards (basketball)
Medalists at the 1999 Pan American Games
Medalists at the 2003 Pan American Games